Heine Eriksen is a Danish team handball coach. He trains Aarhus United, since 2017 and the Danish national youth team.

References

Danish male handball players
Danish handball coaches
Living people
Year of birth missing (living people)